Evil Invaders is the second album released in 1985 by Canadian speed/thrash metal band Razor. The album's art, depicting an evil cyborg of living tissue over a metal endoskeleton, is reminiscent of the title character from the science fiction action film The Terminator, released one year prior. A music video was made for "Evil Invaders".

Track listing

Notes 
 The 1989 CD release by Roadracer Records and the bootlegged 1991 cassette release by MG Records were part of the "Price Killers" line
 Re-issued as a 12" limited edition colored vinyl in 2014 by Storm from the Past Records, limited to 500 copies. It also comes with lyric insert
 Re-issued in 2019 as a 12" limited edition colored vinyl by Hammerheart Records, limited to 1,000 copies

Personnel 
Stace McLaren – vocals
Dave Carlo – guitars
Mike Campagnolo – bass
Mike Embro – drums

Production 
Robin Brouwer – engineering
Peter Domanski – artwork
Robert Matichak – mastering
Walter Zwol – producer
Garth Richardson – engineering
Lindsay Lozon – photography
Garnet Giesbrecht – art direction, design
Gary Cooper – cover illustration

1985 albums
Razor (band) albums